Crocker is an archaic synonym of potter.

People and fictional characters 
 Crocker (name)

Places

United States 
 Crocker, Indiana, an unincorporated community
 Crocker, Iowa, an unincorporated community
 Crocker, Missouri, a city
 Crocker, South Dakota, a census-designated place
 Crocker, Washington, a census designated place
 Mount Crocker, California
 Crocker Mountain (Maine)

Elsewhere
 Mount Crocker, east of Comet, Queensland, Australia
 Crocker Mountains, Sabah, Malaysia

Business
 Crocker & Brewster, an American publisher based in Boston (1818–76)
 Crocker Motorcycles, an American motorcycle manufacturer
 Crocker National Bank, an American bank bought by Wells Fargo

Other uses
 Crocker (sport), combination of soccer football and cricket
 Crocker Art Museum, Sacramento, California

See also
 Betty Crocker, a brand name owned by General Mills